William Harry Hurrell (born 15 January 1990) is an English former rugby union player who played as a centre for London Welsh, Leicester, Coventry, Doncaster, Bristol Bears and Bath.

Born in Melton Mowbray and a product of Melton R.F.C, Hurrell was educated at Loughborough Grammar School and Wyggeston and Queen Elizabeth I College. He was capped by the England U20s.

Hurrell began his career with Leicester Tigers before joining London Welsh for their Championship-winning season in 2011-12. He left the club at the end of the season to study at Aston University. He played for Coventry in National League 1 while at university, before joining Doncaster ahead of the 2015–16 Championship season. After being named in the Championship team of the season, he joined Bristol Bears in the summer of 2016. He spent half a season on loan at Bath in 2018.

Hurrell announced his retirement in April 2020 on medical advice after suffering a probable stroke following a head injury in a game against Leicester.

References

External links
 http://www.leicestertigers.com/rugby/leicester_tigers_senior_squad.php?player=20335&includeref=dynamic

1990 births
Living people
Alumni of Aston University
Bath Rugby players
Bedford Blues players
Bristol Bears players
Coventry R.F.C. players
Doncaster R.F.C. players
English rugby union players
Leicester Tigers players
London Welsh RFC players
People educated at Loughborough Grammar School
Rugby union players from Melton Mowbray
Rugby union centres